Ilhomjon Barotov (born 21 July 1990) is a Tajik professional football player who plays for FK Istaravshan as a midfielder.

Career

International
Saidov made his senior team debut on 15 October 2013 against Kyrgyzstan.

Career statistics

International

Statistics accurate as of match played 29 May 2021

International goals
As of match played 10 July 2019. Tajikistan score listed first, score column indicates score after each Nazarov goal.

References

1990 births
Living people
Tajikistani footballers
Tajikistan international footballers
Association football midfielders